Jamie Merchant (born 13 July 1989) is a Jamaican cricketer. He made his List A debut for Jamaica in the 2018–19 Regional Super50 tournament on 12 October 2018. In October 2019, he was named in Jamaica's squad for the 2019–20 Regional Super50 tournament. In May 2022, in round three of the 2021–22 West Indies Championship, Merchant took his maiden five-wicket haul in first-class cricket, with 5/72 against the Windward Islands.

References

External links
 

1989 births
Living people
Jamaican cricketers
Jamaica cricketers
Place of birth missing (living people)